Daegu Metropolitan Transit Corporation (DTRO) is a public corporation which runs the Daegu Metro Lines 1, 2 and 3 established in 1995. To 2008, it was called Daegu Metropolitan Subway Corporation.

History 
 20 November 1995 established Daegu Metropolitan Subway Corporation
 26 November 1997 opened Line 1 (Jincheon–Jungangno)
 2 May 1998 opened Line 1 (Jungangno–Ansim) fully
 10 May 2002 opened Line 1 (Daegok–Jincheon)
 18 October 2005 opened Line 2 (Munyang–Sawol) fully
 1 October 2008 renamed to Daegu Metropolitan Transit Corporation
 19 September 2012 opened Line 2 (Sawol–Yeungnam Univ.)
 23 April 2015 opened Line 3 (Chilgok Kyungpook Nat'l Univ. Medical Center–Yongji)

External links 
  (in Korean)
  (in English)
 Urban Railroad Construction Headquarters – Daegu Metropolitan City Government

Daegu Metro
Railway companies of South Korea
Transport operators of South Korea
Railway companies established in 1995
Transport in Daegu
1995 establishments in South Korea